Omaheke is one of the fourteen regions of Namibia, the least populous region. Its capital is Gobabis. It lies in eastern Namibia on the border with Botswana and is the western extension of the Kalahari desert. The self-governed villages of Otjinene, Leonardville and Witvlei are situated in the region. , Omaheke had 48,594 registered voters.

Economy and infrastructure

Gobabis is the centre of this area and also its main business area, as it is linked with the capital of Namibia, Windhoek, by rail and the tarred B6 national road. This infrastructure serves as the main supply line for the region.

All the other population centres in the region are linked with Gobabis by road. Many other services are rendered from Gobabis to the region, such as the Police Divisional Headquarters, which is situated in Gobabis. Clinics in the region are served by medical practitioners based in Gobabis, and there are two hospitals and a clinic serving the region.

The agricultural patterns of this region is to a large extent homogenous. Most of the 900 commercial and 3,500 communal farmers in this area are cattle breeders. A regional office of the Ministry of Agriculture, serving the whole region, is based in Gobabis.

Hunting, including trophy hunting, is one of the major sources of income for the region. This takes place mainly in the winter months, from June to August. During these months, tourists from the northern hemisphere can be seen in the area, enjoying the mild and dry winter climate and collecting trophies.

In 2013 Omaheke had 42 government schools with a total of 18,365 pupils.

Politics
Upon independence of Namibia, Hereroland East was absorbed into Omaheke Region. The region comprises seven constituencies:
 Aminuis
 Epukiro
 Gobabis
 Kalahari
 Okorukambe (formerly Steinhausen)
 Otjinene
 Otjombinde

Presidential elections
In the 2004 presidential election, the Omaheke Region supported SWAPO Hifikepunye Pohamba with 13,005 votes (46%) but the Ohangwena Region native did not win a majority of the votes in the region. National Unity Democratic Organisation (NUDO)'s Kuaima Riruako, paramount chief of the Herero people, received over 7,000 votes (25%), and the Democratic Turnhalle Alliance (DTA)'s Katuutire Kaura received over 3,700 votes (13%). Only in the much more populated Khomas Region and neighboring Otjozondjupa Region did Riruako gain more votes, and in no other region did NUDO's candidate gain a higher percentage of the votes.

Regional elections
In the 2015 regional elections SWAPO obtained 54% of the total votes (2010: 47%) and won four of the seven constituencies. NUDO obtained 23% of the total votes (2010: 26%) and won Aminuis and Otjinene, while Otjombinde was won by an independent candidate. Although SWAPO's support dropped to 44% of the total votes in the 2020 regional election, it won five of the seven constituencies, while NUDO (23% total) kept its strongholds Otjinene and Aminuis.

Governors
 unknown (1992–2001)
 Laura McLeod-Katjirua (SWAPO, 2001–2012)
 Rapama Kamehozu (2012–2013)
Festus Ueitele (2013–2020)
Pijoo Nganate (2020–present)

Demographics
According to the 2012 Namibia Labour Force Survey, unemployment in the Omaheke Region is 34.1%.

Language
According to the 2011 census, 43% of the population speak Otjiherero, 30% speak Nama/Damara and 8% speak Afrikaans at home.

Characteristics
In the east, Omaheke borders are three districts of Botswana:
North-West - northern
Ghanzi - eastern
Kgalagadi - southern
Domestically, it borders the following regions:
Hardap - south
Khomas - west
Otjozondjupa - north

Omaheke is traversed by the northwesterly line of equal latitude and longitude.

A large part of this region is known as the Sandveld. The northeastern part of the region is still very much wilderness.

Anthropologically, almost the entire Ovambanderu and Gobabis-Juǀwa ethnic groups reside in the region. Furthermore, it is a rich cultural area for Herero, Damara-Nama, Tswana, Afrikaners and Germans.

One of its notable event is the annual Meat Festival.

History
On 11 August 1904, a German armed force with artillery and machine guns, which had encircled the Herero who had fled to the Waterberg in Namibia, attacked and forced the survivors to flee to the Omaheke desert, where large numbers died. Those who tried to emerge from the desert were killed by German patrols along the perimeter of the Omaheke. This was the turning point in the Herero and Namaqua Genocide.

External links

References

 
Otjiherero words and phrases
Regions of Namibia
States and territories established in 1992
1992 establishments in Namibia